Tony Malaby (born January 12, 1964) is an American jazz tenor saxophonist.

Malaby was born in Tucson, Arizona. He moved to New York City in 1995 and played with several notable jazz groups, including Charlie Haden’s Liberation Music Orchestra, Paul Motian's Electric Bebop Band, Mark Helias's Open Loose, Fred Hersch's Trio + 2 and Walt Whitman project. He also played with bands led by Mario Pavone, Chris Lightcap, Bobby Previte, Tom Varner, Marty Ehrlich, Angelica Sanchez, Mark Dresser, and Kenny Wheeler. Other collaborators included Tom Rainey, Christian Lillinger, Ben Monder, Eivind Opsvik, Nasheet Waits, Samo Šalamon and Michael Formanek. His first album as a co-leader was Cosas with Joey Sellers.

The New York Times has called him one "of the best players of their generation."

Gallery

Discography

As leader
 Sabino (Arabesque, 2000)
 Apparitions (Songlines, 2003)
 Adobe (Sunnyside, 2004)
 Tamarindo (Clean Feed, 2007)
 Warblepeck (Songlines, 2008)
 Paloma Recio (New World, 2009)
 Voladores (Clean Feed, 2009)
 Tamarindo Live (Clean Feed, 2010)
 Novela (Clean Feed, 2011)
 Somos Agua (Clean Feed, 2014)
 Scorpion Eater (Clean Feed, 2014)
 Incantations (Clean Feed, 2016)
 The Cave of Winds (Pyroclastic, 2022)

As sideman
with Damian Allegretti
 Stoddard Place

with Kris Davis
 Lifespan (Fresh Sound, 2004)
 The Slightest Shift (Fresh Sound, 2006)
 Rye Eclipse (Fresh Sound, 2008)
 Diatom Ribbons (Pyroclastic Records, 2019)
With Charlie Haden Liberation Music Orchestra 
Not in Our Name (Verve, 2005)
Time/Life (Impulse!, 2016)
with Pandelis Karayorgis and Mat Maneri
 Disambiguation (Leo, 2002)

with Paul Motian
 Garden of Eden (ECM, 2004)
With Mario Pavone
Mythos (Playscape, 2002)
Orange (Playscape, 2003)
Boom (Playscape, 2004)
Ancestors (Playscape, 2008)
with Samo Salamon
 Two Hours (Fresh Sound New Talent, 2006)
 Traveling Moving Breathing (Clean Feed Records, 2018)

References

 Liner notes, Tony Malaby's Paloma Recio

External links
 Official site
 [ All Music]
 Tony Malaby's Video

1964 births
Living people
American jazz saxophonists
American male saxophonists
CIMP artists
21st-century American saxophonists
21st-century American male musicians
American male jazz musicians
Clean Feed Records artists
Arabesque Records artists
Sunnyside Records artists
NoBusiness Records artists